Events from the year 1576 in Sweden

Incumbents
 Monarch – John III

Events

 Foundation of the controversial Catholic academy Collegium Regium Stockholmense under Laurentius Nicolai in Stockholm, which provokes the Protestants.
 The 1576 Plot is exposed.

Births

 - Jesper Mattson Cruus af Edeby, soldier and politician  (died 1622)

Deaths

References

 
Years of the 16th century in Sweden
Sweden